Rodenberg is a town in Lower Saxony, Germany.  It is also a German surname.

Rodenberg may also refer to:

Places
Rodenberg (Samtgemeinde), a collective municipality in Lower Saxony, Germany

People
August Rodenberg (1873–1933), American tug of war athlete
Carl-Heinz Rodenberg (1904–1995), German neurologist and psychiatrist, member of the Nazi Action T4 euthanasia program
John Rodenberg, American jurist from Minnesota
Julius Rodenberg (1831–1914), German Jewish poet and author
Michael Rodenberg, German keyboardist
William A. Rodenberg (1865–1937), U.S. Representative from Illinois

See also
Rosenberg

German-language surnames
Disambiguation pages with surname-holder lists